The UAMS Northwest campus is community-based regional medical campus, and a satellite campus of the University of Arkansas for Medical Sciences. It is located in the former  Washington Regional Medical Center near the VA Hospital in Fayetteville, Arkansas, and is opening in phases, which started in 2009 as part of the nearly $500 million expansion of the UAMS campus in Little Rock. A $3 million phase one renovation was completed in 2009 which provided new classroom, student, and office space and allowed the first group of medical students to attend UAMS Northwest that fall. Phase two of the expansion, undertaken in 2011, added students from the colleges of pharmacy, nursing and health professions.

References 

University of Arkansas for Medical Sciences